Fredia is a genus of moths of the family Crambidae. It contains only one species, Fredia tchahbaharia, which is found in Iran.

References

Cybalomiinae
Taxa named by Hans Georg Amsel
Monotypic moth genera
Crambidae genera